Biesiadki refers to the following places in Poland:

 Biesiadki, Lesser Poland Voivodeship
 Biesiadki, Lublin Voivodeship